"(It's Always Gonna Be) Someday" is a song co-written and recorded by American country music artist Holly Dunn.  It was released in November 1988 as the second single from the album Across the Rio Grande.  The song reached #11 on the Billboard Hot Country Singles & Tracks chart.  The song was written by Dunn, Tom Shapiro and Chris Waters.

Chart performance

References

1989 singles
Holly Dunn songs
Songs written by Holly Dunn
Songs written by Tom Shapiro
Songs written by Chris Waters
MTM Records singles
1988 songs